Corallimorphus profundus is a species of corals in the genus Corallimorphus. It lives in marine habitats. This species can be found in the Southern Ocean  and in New Zealand.

C. profundus is considered a deep water species that most closely resembles the scleractinians: stony corals. Based on their morphological properties and genome organization, they are heavily scleractinian like in comparison to all other corallimorharians. This makes C. profundus an early diverging species that holds a key role in the coral to corallimorpharia transition.

References

Corallimorphidae
Corals described in 1877